611 Place is a 42-story,  skyscraper at 611 West 6th Street in Downtown Los Angeles, California, designed by William L. Pereira & Associates and completed in 1969. The building was commissioned by the now-defunct Crocker Citizen's Bank, and served as its Southern California headquarters until 1983, when it moved to Crocker Center, now Wells Fargo Center (Los Angeles). It was subsequently bought by AT&T. It was the tallest building in Los Angeles upon completion, and the first building to surpass Los Angeles City Hall in terms of structural height (many buildings had surpassed City Hall with decorative spires, the first being Richfield Tower). It consists of a cross-shaped tower clad in vertical aluminum beams, and supported on its west side by an immense, blank slab of concrete running the entire height of the building, which houses elevator and utility shafts and is used to display corporate logos. The building features a number of Pereira's design trademarks, including cleft vertical columns, grid patterned ceilings, and architectural lanterns fitted to the exterior.

The building has appeared in several movies:

Mr. Mom (1983), where it appeared as the location of the Richardson Advertising Agency.
Con Air (1997), the building be seen from an aerial view and street view as a dead body falls from an aircraft and lands on a car near the base of the building in the city of Fresno, California. 
Epicenter (2000), This building is destroyed by an earthquake in this movie.
The Day After Tomorrow (2004), where it appeared in shots of Manhattan. 
Along Came Polly (2004), where it was the starting point of an ill-fated BASE jump.
 The morning show(2019 - 1st season, 2021 - 2nd season), where 611 place is shown as UBA's headquarters.

See also
List of tallest buildings in Los Angeles

References

1960s architecture in the United States
1969 establishments in California
AT&T buildings
Bank company headquarters in the United States
Buildings and structures in Downtown Los Angeles
Financial District, Los Angeles
Office buildings completed in 1969
Skyscraper office buildings in Los Angeles
William Pereira buildings